Kirsty Mepham (born 13 August 1969) is a British equestrian. She competed in two events at the 2000 Summer Olympics.

References

External links
 

1969 births
Living people
British female equestrians
British dressage riders
Olympic equestrians of Great Britain
Equestrians at the 2000 Summer Olympics
People from Tonbridge